Myristica xylocarpa is a species of plant in the family Myristicaceae. It is endemic to the Solomon Islands.

References

Flora of the Solomon Islands (archipelago)
xylocarpa
Near threatened plants
Taxonomy articles created by Polbot